The 2020 LendingTree Bowl was a college football bowl game played on January 6, 2020, with kickoff at 7:30 p.m. EST (6:30 p.m. local CST) on ESPN. It was the 21st edition of the LendingTree Bowl, and was the last of the 2019–20 bowl games concluding the 2019 FBS football season, with only the National Championship and all-star games to follow. The game's title sponsor was online lending marketplace LendingTree.

Teams
The game matched the Mid-American Conference (MAC) champions Miami RedHawks and the Louisiana Ragin' Cajuns from the Sun Belt Conference. This was the third meeting between the two programs; the RedHawks had won both of the prior meetings.

Miami RedHawks

Miami entered the game with an 8–5 record (6–2 in conference). They finished atop the MAC's East Division, then won the MAC Championship Game over Central Michigan, 26–21. The RedHawks lost to both ranked opponents they faced, Iowa and Ohio State. After starting their season 2–4, Miami had a five-game winning streak before losing to Ball State in their regular season finale.

This was Miami's third LendingTree Bowl. The RedHawks had won both of their previous appearances; the 2003 GMAC Bowl (over Louisville) and the 2011 GoDaddy.com Bowl (over Middle Tennessee), when the bowl operated under different names.

Louisiana Ragin' Cajuns

Louisiana entered the game with a 10–3 record (7–1 in conference). The finished atop the West Division of the Sun Belt, then lost the Sun Belt Championship Game to Appalachian State, 45–38. Along with a regular season loss to Appalachian State, the only other team to defeat the Ragin' Cajuns was Mississippi State. This was the first LendingTree Bowl appearance for Louisiana.

This was Louisiana's seventh bowl game in program history; in their prior six bowls, they had an official record of 2–2, as two other bowl wins were later vacated. The Cajuns won four consecutive New Orleans Bowls under head coach Mark Hudspeth. In the 2011 edition, the 8–4 Cajuns beat San Diego State, 32–30, on a game-winning field goal. In the 2012 edition, the 8–4 Cajuns defeated East Carolina, 43–34. In the 2013 edition, the 8–4 Cajuns defeated the hometown Tulane Green Wave, 24–21. In the 2014 edition, the 8–4 Cajuns defeated Nevada, 16–3. Subsequently, the Cajuns had to the vacate their 2011 and 2013 wins, due to NCAA violations. The team returned to play in the 2016 New Orleans Bowl, with the 6–6 Cajuns losing to Southern Miss, 21–28, one of the closest games in rivalry history. In 2018, the Cajuns hired a new head coach, Billy Napier, who led the 7–6 Cajuns to the Sun Belt West Divisional Championship and the 2018 Cure Bowl, losing to Tulane, 24–41.

Game summary

This was the first bowl win for the Louisiana Ragin' Cajuns program outside the state of Louisiana since 1944, when the team was known as Southwestern Louisiana and they won the Oil Bowl in Houston. In additional to Louisiana quarterback Levi Lewis being named the game's overall MVP, wide receiver Ja’Marcus Bradley, defensive back Eric Garror, and placekicker Stevie Artigue were recognized as offensive, defensive, and special teams MVPs, respectively.

Statistics

Notes

References

External links
 Game statistics at statbroadcast.com

LendingTree Bowl
LendingTree Bowl
Louisiana Ragin' Cajuns football bowl games
Miami RedHawks football bowl games
LendingTree Bowl
LendingTree Bowl